Kryptonite! is a 2011 Italian comedy film directed by Ivan Cotroneo.

Cast
 Valeria Golino as Rosaria
 Cristiana Capotondi as Titina
 Luca Zingaretti as Antonio
 Antonia Truppo as Valeria
 Libero De Rienzo as Salvatore
 Luigi Catani as Peppino
 Vincenzo Nemolato as Gennaro
 Monica Nappo as Assunta
 Massimiliano Gallo as Arturo
 Lucia Ragni as Carmela
 Gennaro Cuomo as Federico
 Sergio Solli as Vincenzo
 Anita Caprioli as Madonna
 Fabrizio Gifuni as Matarrese

Awards

References

External links
 

2011 films
2011 comedy-drama films
Italian comedy-drama films
2010s Italian-language films
Films set in 1973
2010s Italian films